Alexander Jacob may refer to:

 Marius Jacob (Alexandre Jacob, 1879–1954), French anarchist illegalist
 Alexander Malcolm Jacob (1849–1921), diamond and gemstone trader in Shimla
 Alexander Jacob (police officer) (born 1955), Indian police officer in Kerala